Paramignya is a genus of flowering plants belonging to the family Rutaceae.

Its native range is Southern China to Tropical Asia.

Species
Species:

Paramignya andamanica 
Paramignya armata 
Paramignya beddomei 
Paramignya citrifolia 
Paramignya confertifolia 
Paramignya cuspidata 
Paramignya grandiflora 
Paramignya hispida 
Paramignya lobata 
Paramignya mindanaensis 
Paramignya monophylla 
Paramignya petelotii 
Paramignya rectispinosa 
Paramignya scandens 
Paramignya surasiana 
Paramignya trimera

References

Aurantioideae
Aurantioideae genera